The 2018 season was Brantford Galaxy's seventh season in the Canadian Soccer League. Their season began on May 25, 2018 in an away match against CSC Mississauga. Despite the team's mediocre season they still clinched the final playoff berth. Their participation in the postseason was short lived as they were eliminated by FC Ukraine United in the first round. While their reserve squad faced a similar fate in the Second Division after losing to FC Vorkuta B in the opening round. The club's top goalscorer was Slavko Knezevic with three goals.

Summary
After the departure of Sasa Vukovic to Hamilton City SC, the club brought in Milan Prpa as head coach. The roster assembled by Prpa remained primarily the same as the previous seasons with many notable veterans returning. Overall the changes in management achieved little difference in the performance of the club. As the club produced a mediocre season by finishing eighth in the First Division, but still managed to secure the final playoff berth. In the opening round of the postseason Brantford faced FC Ukraine United, but were eliminated in a penalty shootout.

Meanwhile in the Second Division their reserve team managed to secure a postseason berth. In the playoffs they faced division champions FC Vorkuta B, and were defeated by a score of 3-1.

Players

First Division roster

Second Division roster

Management

Transfers

In

Out

Canadian Soccer League

First Division

Results summary

Results by round

Matches

Postseason

Second Division

Results summary

Results by round

Matches

Postseason

Statistics

Goals 
Correct as of October 13, 2018

References 

Brantford Galaxy
Brantford Galaxy
Brantford Galaxy